Daniel E. Sparks (born April 17, 1944) is an American former professional basketball player and college coach. He played in the American Basketball Association for the Miami Floridians during the 1968–69 and 1969–70 seasons after a split collegiate career at Vincennes University and Weber State University. Sparks was selected in both the 1968 ABA and NBA drafts by the Miami Floridians and Cincinnati Royals, respectively.

In 2015, Sparks was inducted into the Indiana Basketball Hall of Fame. Although he garnered success as a player, having won the NJCAA national championship at Vincennes in 1965 and having served as Weber State's team MVP during their NCAA Tournament season in 1967–68, he is best known for his coaching career. He coached at the junior college level for 33 seasons, primarily at his alma mater Vincennes, and amassed 869 wins (versus only 247 losses) during his hall of fame career. Sparks coached 25 NJCAA All-Americans and 33 future professional players in his career, including Eric Williams, Shawn Marion, Tyrone Nesby, and Carl Landry. He is the state of Indiana's all-time winningest coach (706 victories) and was the national coach of the year in 1985–86.

References

1945 births
Living people
American men's basketball coaches
American men's basketball players
Basketball coaches from Indiana
Basketball players from Indiana
Cincinnati Royals draft picks
Indiana State University alumni
Kansas City Kings assistant coaches
Miami Floridians draft picks
Miami Floridians players
Northern Colorado Bears men's basketball coaches
Power forwards (basketball)
Sportspeople from Bloomington, Indiana
Vincennes Trailblazers men's basketball coaches
Vincennes Trailblazers men's basketball players
Wabash Valley Warriors men's basketball coaches
Weber State Wildcats men's basketball players